Ieva Melle (born 1 April 1985) is a Latvian Paralympic archer.

She has competed once at the Summer Paralympics and made appearances in the World Para Archery Championships and World Cup Stages. She specialises in making jewellery. 

Melle's performance in the 2015 World Archery Para Championships saw her qualify for the 2016 Summer Paralympics, her debut games. She earned the spot in the women's recurve open after defeating Czech archer Marketa Sidkova in straight sets.

References

Archers at the 2016 Summer Paralympics
Living people
Paralympic archers of Latvia
1985 births